A demonstration sport, or exhibition sport, is a sport which is played to promote it, rather than as part of standard medal competition. This occurs commonly during the Olympic Games, but may also occur at other sporting events.

Demonstration sports were officially introduced in the 1912 Summer Olympics, when Sweden decided to include glima, traditional Icelandic wrestling, in the Olympic program, but with its medals not counting as official. Most organizing committees then decided to include at least one demonstration sport at each edition of the Games, usually some typical or popular sport in the host country, like baseball at the 1984 Los Angeles Olympic Games and taekwondo at the 1988 Seoul Olympic Games. From 1912 to 1992, only two Summer Olympics Games did not have demonstration sports on their program. Some demonstration sports eventually gained enough popularity to become an official sport in a subsequent edition of the Games. Traditionally, the medals awarded for the demonstration events followed the same design as the Olympic medals, but of a smaller size. They are never included in the medal count.

Demonstration sports were suspended after the 1992 Summer Olympics, as the Olympic program grew bigger and it became more difficult for the organizing committees to give them the appropriate attention, since the IOC required the same treatment to be dispensed for official and demonstration sports. It is unlikely that they will be reintroduced as a requirement for future Olympic organizing committees. However, the Beijing Olympic Committee received permission from the IOC to run a wushu (martial arts) competition parallel to the 2008 Beijing Olympic Games, Wushu Tournament Beijing 2008.

From the 1984 Summer Olympics until the 2004 Summer Olympics, two Paralympic events (a men's and a women's wheelchair racing event) were included in the athletics programme of each Games. These events are considered by many as a demonstration sport, but are, in fact, used to promote the Paralympic Games.  Disabled events in alpine and Nordic skiing (1988 only) were also held as demonstration sports at the 1984 and 1988 Winter Olympics.

Summer Olympics

Here is the list of demonstration sports played at the Summer Olympic Games:

Under the event-based program that began with the 2020 Olympic Games, the host organizing committees added the following sports to the program with full medal status:

1 Although demonstration sports were introduced only in 1912, at the 1908 Olympics some sports competitions were held simultaneously to the games.
2 Baseball was officially removed from the Olympic program after the 2008 Beijing Games. (See also 8)
3 Was part of the program as field handball in 1936.
4 Was part of the program between 1896 and 1924.
5 The IOC permitted a parallel wushu competition to be run (2008 Beijing Wushu Tournament), but this was not an official demonstration sport.
6 The IOC permitted a parallel esports competition to be run (known as the eGames), but this was not an official demonstration sport.
7 Though not explicitly listed as a demonstration sport, the Japan Sumo Association originally planned to hold a special two-day exhibition sumo tournament between the Olympics and Paralympics as part of a larger official Olympics cultural festival; this was cancelled due to rescheduling of the 2020 Olympics to 2021.
8 On 3 August 2016, the 129th IOC Session was held in Rio de Janeiro, Brazil. At this conference, the IOC agreed a new policy to shift the Games to use an "event-based" program rather than a "sport-based" program. Under this new policy, the host organizing committee can propose the addition of sports to the program. Baseball/softball were added back to the program for 2020 only in this way, along with karate, sport climbing, surfing, and skateboarding.
9 On 24 June 2019, the 134th IOC Session was held in Lausanne, Switzerland. At this conference, the Paris Organising Committee proposed that surfing, sport climbing, and skateboarding all return, along with the addition of breaking. On 7 December 2020, the IOC confirmed all four sports.

Winter Olympics
Here is the list of demonstration sports played at the Winter Olympic Games:

1 Curling was part of the program in 1924, which in 2002 the IOC retroactively decided would be considered an official Olympic event.
2 Though not listed as a demonstration sport, the Intel Extreme Masters held an esports tournament for two games (StarCraft II and Steep) with official support from the IOC.

Commonwealth Games

Demonstration sports have also been held during the Commonwealth Games, sometimes under the heading of exhibition sports.

1 The CGF endorsed a rugby league nines competition (2014 Rugby League Commonwealth Championship) to be held preceding the games, but this was not listed an official demonstration sport.
2 The CGF endorsed a rugby league nines competition (2018 Rugby League Commonwealth Championship) to be held preceding the games, but this was not listed an official demonstration sport.
3  The CGF endorsed an esports competition (Commonwealth Esports Championship) to be held during the games, but this was not listed an official demonstration sport.

See also
 Commonwealth Games sports
 Olympic sports
 World Games

References

External links
International Olympic Committee
Olympic Official Reports
List of Olympic medallists